The High Flux Australian Reactor (HIFAR) was Australia's first nuclear reactor. The reactor was in operation between 1958 and 2007, when it was superseded by the Open-pool Australian lightwater reactor, also in Lucas Heights.

Background and operation
Based on the DIDO reactor at Harwell in the UK, HIFAR was cooled and moderated by heavy water (D2O), and the fuel was enriched uranium. There was also a graphite neutron reflector surrounding the core. Like DIDO, its original purpose was nuclear materials testing, using its high neutron flux to give materials intended for use in nuclear power reactors their entire expected lifetime neutron exposure in a relatively short period.

HIFAR was used for research, particularly neutron diffraction experiments, production of neutron transmutation doped (NTD) silicon, and for production of medical and industrial radioisotopes.

HIFAR went critical at 11:15 pm local time on 26 January 1958, and was first run at full power of 10 MW (thermal) in 1960. The initial fuel was highly enriched uranium, but over the years the enrichment level of new fuel was steadily reduced, in line with international trends designed to reduce the danger of diversion of research reactor fuel for weapons programs. HIFAR completed conversion to low enriched uranium fuel (LEU) in 2006.
Of the six DIDO class reactors built including DIDO itself, HIFAR was the last to cease operation.  Permanent decommissioning of HIFAR commenced on 30 January 2007 and is expected to be completed by 2025.

On 12 August 2006 Open-pool Australian lightwater reactor (OPAL), the 20 MW replacement reactor located on an adjacent site, went critical. OPAL is served by the same complex of research, isotope production and remote handling laboratories.  The two reactors ran in parallel for six months while OPAL was being tested. HIFAR was then permanently shut down and OPAL took over HIFAR's role of Australia's only operating nuclear reactor.

Engineering heritage award 
The reactor is listed as a National Engineering Landmark by Engineers Australia as part of its Engineering Heritage Recognition Program.

See also 

 Nuclear power in Australia
 Nuclear medicine
 Research reactors

References

Further reading

External links 
HIFAR page at ANSTO.
OPAL page at ANSTO.

Heavy water reactors
Neutron facilities
Nuclear research institutes
Nuclear research reactors
Science and technology in Australia
Nuclear power in Australia
Defunct nuclear reactors
Lucas Heights, New South Wales
1958 establishments in Australia
2007 disestablishments in Australia
Recipients of Engineers Australia engineering heritage markers